These are the Deep Jewels events held by the Japanese mixed martial arts (MMA) organization Deep.

Deep Jewels 1

Deep Jewels 1, originally  was the inaugural MMA event of the Deep Jewels brand after Jewels promotion ceased operations to move the brand to Deep promotion.

Source(s)

Deep Jewels 2

Deep Jewels 2, originally  was the second MMA event of the Deep Jewels brand held by the Japanese promotion Deep. The event featured Seo Hee Ham defending the Deep Jewels featherweight championship, which she won in the Jewels promotion by defeating Naho Sugiyama in the last Jewels event, against Sadae Numata, who won the right to challenge for the championship at Deep Jewels 1. The event also held the first round of the Deep Jewels lightweight tournament to crown a new lightweight champion after former Jewels champion Ayaka Hamasaki had to relinquish the title due to injuries that would leave her unable to compete for some time. The participants of the tournament were Emi Fujino, Mika Nagano, Mizuki Inoue and Emi Tomimatsu. In October 2013 two more bouts were announced, including the debut of former Jewels champion Naho Sugiyama under the Deep Jewels brand. The two more matches were later announced.

Source(s)

Deep Jewels 3

Deep Jewels 3 is an upcoming MMA event of the Deep Jewels brand to be held by the Japanese promotion Deep. It will feature the Deep Jewels lightweight grand prix final between Emi Tomimatsu and Mizuki Inoue.

Deep Jewels 4

Deep Jewels 4 is an upcoming MMA event of the Deep Jewels brand to be held by the Japanese promotion Deep.

Deep Jewels 5

Deep Jewels 5 was a MMA event of the Deep Jewels brand to be held by the Japanese promotion Deep.

Deep Jewels 6

Deep Jewels 6 was an MMA event of the Deep Jewels brand held by the Japanese promotion Deep.

Deep Jewels 7

Deep Jewels 7 was an MMA event of the Deep Jewels brand held by the Japanese promotion Deep.

Deep Jewels 8

Deep Jewels 8 was an MMA event of the Deep Jewels brand held by the Japanese promotion Deep.

Deep Jewels 9

Deep Jewels 9 was an MMA event of the Deep Jewels brand held by the Japanese promotion Deep. This was the first event where all the championships were renamed to resemble the rest of the weight limits around the MMA world. The Middleweight Championship is now known as the Bantamweight Championship and the Lightweight Championship is now known as the Strawweight Championship.

Deep Jewels 10

Deep Jewels 10 was an MMA event of the Deep Jewels brand held by the Japanese promotion Deep. The event was promoted as Team Jewels vs. Team Date.

Deep Jewels 11

Deep Jewels 11 was an MMA event of the Deep Jewels brand held by the Japanese promotion Deep.

Deep Jewels 12

Deep Jewels 12 was an MMA event of the Deep Jewels brand held by the Japanese promotion Deep.

Deep Jewels 13

Deep Jewels 13 was an MMA event of the Deep Jewels brand held by the Japanese promotion Deep. The main event featured Mika Nagano coming out of a 3-year retirement.

Deep Jewels 14

Deep Jewels 14 was an MMA event of the Deep Jewels brand held by the Japanese promotion Deep.

Deep Jewels 15

Deep Jewels 15 was an MMA event of the Deep Jewels brand held by the Japanese promotion Deep.

Deep Jewels 16

Deep Jewels 16 was an MMA event of the Deep Jewels brand held by the Japanese promotion Deep.

Deep Jewels 17

Deep Jewels 17 was an MMA event of the Deep Jewels brand held by the Japanese promotion Deep.

Deep Jewels 18

Deep Jewels 18 was an MMA event of the Deep Jewels brand held by the Japanese promotion Deep.

Deep Jewels 19

Deep Jewels 19 was an MMA event of the Deep Jewels brand held by the Japanese promotion Deep.

Deep Jewels 20

Deep Jewels 20 was an MMA event of the Deep Jewels brand held by the Japanese promotion Deep.

Deep Jewels 21

Deep Jewels 21 was an MMA event of the Deep Jewels brand held by the Japanese promotion Deep.

Deep Jewels 22

Deep Jewels 22 was an MMA event of the Deep Jewels brand held by the Japanese promotion Deep.

Deep Jewels 23

Deep Jewels 23 was an MMA event of the Deep Jewels brand held by the Japanese promotion Deep.

Deep Jewels 24

Deep Jewels 24 was an MMA event of the Deep Jewels brand held by the Japanese promotion Deep.

Deep Jewels 25 

Deep Jewels 25 was an MMA Event of the Deep Jewels Brand held by the Japanese Promotion Deep. The event took place on September 1, 2019 at Shinjuku FACE in Tokyo, Japan

Deep Jewels 26 

Deep Jewels 26 was an MMA Event of the Deep Jewels Brand held by the Japanese Promotion Deep. The event took place on October 22, 2019 at Korakuen Hall in Tokyo, Japan

Deep Jewels 27 

Deep Jewels 27 was an MMA Event of the Deep Jewels Brand held by the Japanese Promotion Deep. The event took place on December 22, 2019 at Abeno Activity Center in Osaka, Japan

Deep Jewels 28 

Deep Jewels 28 was an MMA Event of the Deep Jewels Brand held by the Japanese Promotion Deep. The event took place on February 24, 2020 at New Pier Hall in Tokyo, Japan.

Deep Jewels 29 

Deep Jewels 29 is an MMA Event of the Deep Jewels Brand held by the Japanese Promotion Deep. The event was scheduled to take place on May 6, 2020 at Korakuen Hall in Tokyo, Japan. However, due to the COVID-19 pandemic the event was postponed and rescheduled to July 23, 2020 at Shinjuku FACE in Tokyo, Japan

Deep Jewels 30 

Deep Jewels 30 was an MMA Event of the Deep Jewels Brand held by the Japanese Promotion Deep. The event took place on October 31, 2020 at New Pier Hall in Tokyo, Japan. The Event Marks The Final Fight Of Then Champion Tomo Maesawa. Rion Noda Was Originally Scheduled To Face Moeri Suda However Was Injured While Training For The Fight And Was Replaced By The Debuting Aya Murakami

Deep Jewels 31 

Deep Jewels 31 was an MMA Event of the Deep Jewels Brand held by the Japanese Promotion Deep. It took place on December 19, 2020 at Shinjuku FACE in Tokyo, Japan

Deep Jewels 32 

Deep Jewels 32 was an MMA Event of the Deep Jewels Brand held by the Japanese Promotion Deep. It took place on March 7, 2021 at Korakuen Hall in Tokyo, Japan.

Deep Jewels 33 

Deep Jewels 33 also known as DEEP JEWELS 33 - Atomweight GP2021 FINAL was an MMA event of the DEEP JEWELS brand held by the Japanese Promotion Deep. It was initially scheduled to take place on May 5, 2021 at Korakuen Hall in Tokyo, Japan. However, due to the state of emergency caused by the COVID-19 situation in Tokyo, the event was postponed and is now scheduled to take place on June 20, 2021.

On May 5th, It was announced that Aya Murakami had to pull out of the Atomweight Grand Prix tournament as a result of an illness that hospitalized her, As a result of this, Murakami's opponent from the 1st round Mizuki Oshiro was announced as Hikaru Aono's Replacement Opponent.  This also resulted in the reserve fight between Oshiro and Eru Tomimatsu Being Cancelled.

Fight Card

Deep Jewels 34 

Deep Jewels 34 was an MMA event of the DEEP JEWELS brand held by the Japanese Promotion Deep, held on September 4, 2021.

Background
An atomweight bout between Mizuki Oshiro and Mizuki Furuse was scheduled as the event headliner.

A flyweight bout between Mikiko Shimizu and Kate Oyama was announced for the event.

Two fights were added to the card on July 12th: Tae Murayama was scheduled to face PochanZ at lightweight, while Aya Murakami was scheduled to face Kyoka at microweight.

Eru Takebayashi was scheduled to meet fellow prospect Tomoko Inoue in a strawweight bout.

A tag team grappling match featuring Hikaru Aono, Emi Tomimatsu, Seika Izawa and Mika Nagano was announced for the event. The two-person teams decided in a draw made on the day.

An amateur flyweight kickboxing bout between Saki Namakura and Miyu Yamamoto was scheduled as the opening fight of the card.

Fight card

Deep Jewels 35 

Deep Jewels 35 was an MMA event of the DEEP JEWELS brand held by the Japanese Promotion Deep, held on December 11, 2021.

Background
The event was headlined by a strawweight bout between Miki Motono and Namiko Kawabata. A flyweight bout between Aoi Kuriyama and Kate Oyama was scheduled as the co-main event.

Fight card

Deep Jewels 36 

Deep Jewels 36 was an MMA event of the DEEP JEWELS brand held by the Japanese Promotion Deep, held on March 12, 2022.

Background
The quarterfinal bouts of the 2022 Deep Jewels flyweight grand prix were scheduled to take place at the event.

Fight card

Deep Jewels 37 

Deep Jewels 37 was an MMA event of the DEEP JEWELS brand held by the Japanese Promotion Deep, held on May 8, 2022.

Background
A Jewels Atomweight Championship bout between the champion Saori Oshima and title challenger Moeri Suda was booked for the event.

A DEEP Jewels Featherweight championship bout for the inaugural title between Reina Miura and Yoko Higashi was scheduled for the event.

Fight card

Deep Jewels 38 

Deep Jewels 38 was an MMA event of the DEEP JEWELS brand held by the Japanese Promotion Deep, held on September 11, 2022.

Background
The event was headlined by an atomweight bout between Aya Murakami and Moeri Suda, while a 50 kg catchweight bout between Kate Lotus and Eru Takebayashi served as the co-main event.

Fight card

Deep Jewels 39 

Deep Jewels 39 was an MMA event of the DEEP JEWELS brand held by the Japanese Promotion Deep, held on November 23, 2022.

Background
The event was headlined by a bantamweight bout between Yoko Higashi and Titapa Junsookplung. A 49 kilogram catchweight bout between Miki Motono and Moeri Suda served as the co-main event.

Fight card

Deep Jewels 40 

Deep Jewels 40 was an MMA event of the DEEP JEWELS brand held by the Japanese Promotion Deep, held on February 18, 2023.

Background
The event was headlined by a super atomweight bout between Kate Lotus and Hikaru Aono, while a super strawweight bout between Namiko Kawabata and Machi Fukuda served as the co-main event.

Fight card

References

Jewels (mixed martial arts) events
2013 in mixed martial arts
2014 in mixed martial arts
2015 in mixed martial arts
Mixed martial arts in Japan
Sports competitions in Tokyo
2013 in Japanese sport
2014 in Japanese sport
2015 in Japanese sport
Japan sport-related lists
Mixed martial arts events lists
Women's sport-related lists
Women's mixed martial arts